Sooryan is a 2007 Malayalam-language musical action drama film directed by V. M. Vinu, starring Jayaram and Vimala Raman in the lead.

Plot
Sooryan tells the story of Sooryanarayanan, who is a very popular and accomplished singer. His family comprises his mother and his widowed sister Raji and her two kids. There is also his eldest sister, who is married to a businessman named Sundaran. One day, while Sooryanarayanan is on a hospital visit with his niece, he sees someone who sends the shivers down his spine. That someone is Simon Thekkilakaadan, who is crippled and in a wheelchair, and presents a rather pitiful sight.

Thekkilakaadan is accompanied by his sons and others. On seeing them, Sooryanarayanan is shocked and frightened, and hides away in corner. On his way back home, he recollects the incidents of his past, beginning with his father Harinarayanan, a gifted singer of classical music, who was his guru too. From there his memory traces events one by one. He remembers how he nursed ambitions of becoming a good singer himself, and how shocked he was when he discovered the huge debts incurred by his father in the course of looking after the needs of the family. He sets out to get a job to help his father clear the liabilities and joins a bank.

Things are going fine when one day he accidentally meets his college-mate and friend Cherian, who was a former minister. The meeting is destined to be a turning point in Sooryan's life and gradually he meanders into a world of crime and thuggery. Sooryan meets a girl Maya, who finds a place in his heart and eventually falls in love him and they were planning to marry. But Maya and her father witnesses Sooryan cutting Simon's leg in public with a sword as a revenge for Simon cutting Cheriyan's leg. Thinking that he is a gangster, Maya's father goes to Sooryan's house, says that Sooryan is a murderer and cancels the wedding. Heartbroken, Sooryan's father suffers a fatal heart attack and dies.

Cast

 Jayaram as Sooryanarayanan (Sooryan)
 Vimala Raman as Maya
 Sai Kumar as Harinarayanan (Sooryan's father)
 Madhupal
 Nandini as Raji
 Harisree Ashokan
 Suresh Krishna as Cherian
 Babu Swamy
 Kozhikode Narayanan Nair
 Augustine
 Vijayaraghavan as Simon Thekkilakaadan
 Kalaranjini as Sooryan's mother
 Veena
 Zeenath
 Baby Nayanthara
 Archana Menon as Alice
 Baby Riya
 Shajahan Abdulla
 Dinesh Krishnan as DK (cameo)

Soundtrack
"Ishtakarrikku"- Madhu Balakrishnan, Manjari
"Vasantha Nilave" - Madhu Balakrishnan
"Manasse Manasse" - KJ Yesudas
"Ambe Vaanee"- KJ Yesudas, Vijay Yesudas
"Paattellaam- Chorus, Vijay Yesudas
"Shabdamaayi" - Kavalam Sreekumar, Sankaran Namboothiri

References

External links
 

2000s Malayalam-language films
Films scored by Ilaiyaraaja
Films directed by V. M. Vinu